Ion milling machine thins samples until they are transparent to electrons by firing ions (typically argon) at the surface from an angle and sputtering material from the surface. By making a sample electron transparent, it can be imaged and characterized in a transmission electron microscope (TEM). Ion beam milling may also be used for cross-section polishing prior to SEM analysis of materials that are difficult to prepare using mechanical polishing.

See also
 Focused ion beam
 Transmission electron microscope
Electron microscopy